The 2012 Tour de San Luis was the 6th edition of the Tour de San Luis stage race. It was part of the 2011–12 UCI America Tour.
Levi Leipheimer of  won the race, mainly in the time-trial, which he won and where he made the difference with second placed Alberto Contador, who did win two mountain stages. With 2 stage wins for Francesco Chicchi and one for Tom Boonen,  scored an impressive 4 wins out of 7. Italian Elia Viviani also managed to win one stage.

Teams
Twenty one teams were invited to the 2012 Tour de San Luis: 5 UCI ProTeams, 7 Professional Continental teams, 6 Continental teams and 7 national selection teams.

UCI ProTeams

Professional Continental teams

Continental teams

National teams

 Team Argentina (10 riders)
 Team Brazil (6 riders)
 Team Colombia (10 riders)
 Team Chile (9 riders)
 Team Cuba (6 riders)
 Team Ecuador (6 riders)
 Team Uruguay (8 riders)

Schedule

Stages

Stage 1, San Luis to Villa Mercedes

Stage 2, Fraga to Juana Koslay

Stage 3, Estancia Grande to Mirador del Portero

Stage 4, San Luis to San Luis

Stage 5, La Toma to Mirador del Sol

Stage 6, Luján to Quines

Stage 7, San Luis to San Luis

References

External links

Tour de San Luis
Tour de San Luis
Tour de San Luis
Tour de San Luis